is a 1956 Japanese drama film directed by Masaki Kobayashi. It is based on a novel by Minoru Ōno.

Plot
Kishimoto is a talent scout for the Toyo Flowers baseball club, one of three competitors who try to buy new promising hitter Kurita for their team. While Kurita's shadowy benefactor and manager Kyuki, who financed the student's education, is making negotiations, Kurita's girlfriend Fudeko tries to talk him out of entering the professional baseball league. The competitors finally meet at the countryside home of Kurita's family, who have their own plans for their son and brother.

Cast
 Keiji Sada as Kishimoto
 Yūnosuke Itō as Kyuki
 Keiko Kishi as Fudeko, Kurita's girlfriend
 Minoru Ōki as Kurita
 Eijirō Tōno as Ogushi
 Mitsuko Mito as Ryuko, Kyuki's mistress
 Kōji Mitsui as Tamekichi

Reception
Film historians Donald Richie and Joseph L. Anderson wrote in their 1959 compendium The Japanese Film – Art & Industry that "Kobayashi lacked the power to present a really smashing indictment". In his Critical Handbook of Japanese Film Directors: From the Silent Era to the Present Day, Alexander Jacoby called I Will Buy You a "critique of commercial values in the world of sport" which benefited from the persona of actor Yūnosuke Itō.

Kinema Junpo named I Will Buy You the 10th best film of 1956, and star Keiji Sada won its Best Actor award. He also won both the Mainichi Film Awards and Blue Ribbon Awards as Best Actor for I Will Buy You and Typhoon. Jun Tatara won a tie-breaking vote at the Blue Ribbon Awards for Best Supporting Actor (for this film and two others) after concerns about Kōji Mitsui's on-set drunkenness were raised by voters; a chastened Mitsui (who had a showy and much larger  role in the film than Tatara) reportedly resolved not to drink anymore while performing, subsequently winning the award the following year and beginning the highest-profile period of his career.

References

External links

1956 films
Japanese drama films
Japanese black-and-white films
Films based on Japanese novels
Films directed by Masaki Kobayashi
1950s Japanese films
1956 drama films